Galina Vladimirovna Vinogradova (née Galkina) (born 10 February 1979) is a Russian orienteering competitor. She received her first medal in the relay event at the 2008 World Orienteering Championships in Olomouc, coming second together with Yulia Novikova and Tatiana Ryabkina., and also finished 4th in the Sprint Discipline.

She received a Bronze medal in Sprint at both the 2015 World Orienteering Championships and the 2017 World Orienteering Championships.

References

External links
 
 

1979 births
Living people
Russian orienteers
Female orienteers
Foot orienteers
World Orienteering Championships medalists
World Games gold medalists
World Games bronze medalists
Competitors at the 2009 World Games
Competitors at the 2017 World Games
World Games medalists in orienteering
Junior World Orienteering Championships medalists